The Illinois Department of Central Management Services (CMS) is a code department of the Illinois state government that is generally responsible for certain state properties, acquisitions, and services.

It operates the Illinois Century Network (ICN), a network to provide internet access to state agencies, schools, universities, public libraries, and museums. On October 4, 2013, Governor Pat Quinn appointed Simone McNeil as the acting Director of Central Management Services.

References

External links

 

Central Management